Oldershaw is a surname. Notable people with the surname include:

Bert Oldershaw (1921–2006), Canadian sprint canoeist and sprint kayaker
Cally Oldershaw, gemologist and science educator
Dean Oldershaw (born 1946), Canadian sprint canoeist and kayaker
Doug Oldershaw (1915–1995), professional American football guard in the National Football League
Jen Oldershaw, presenter on Triple J, lecturer at the Australian Film Television and Radio School
John Oldershaw (died 1847), British clergyman
Mark Oldershaw (born 1983), Canadian sprint canoeist
Reed Oldershaw (born 1951), Canadian sprint kayaker
Scott Oldershaw (born 1954), Canadian sprint kayaker

See also
The Oldershaw Academy, secondary school located in the Liscard area of Wallasey, England
Oldershaw O-2, American high-wing, single seat, V-tailed glider designed and built by Vernon Oldershaw
Oldershaw O-3, American high-wing, single seat, V-tailed glider designed by Vernon Oldershaw